Robert D. Eberle (born 1934) is an American former politician in the state of Washington. He served the 30th district and 35th districts in the House of Representatives.

References

Living people
1934 births
People from Missouri
Republican Party members of the Washington House of Representatives